Adranika is a fictional race introduced in the GMA TV Series - Mars Ravelo's Darna.  The TV series is produced by GMA in cooperation with the Estate of Mars Ravelo and Mango Comics. The term "Adranika" is based on the term "Adarna Warriors" which was coined in the Mango Comics Darna comicbook mini-series. The Adranikas were led by Queen Adran and her loyal right-hand person Aio.  They were under siege from the evil Anomalka, led by their queen of darkness, Braguda in the planet of Marte.

Although the original "Darna" series by Mars Ravelo specifically states that Darna is from the "Planet Marte", the term "Adranika" (describing Darna's race) was NOT created by Mars Ravelo.

Overview 
Fighting for survival, Queen Adran decided to send off Aio on a mission to find a worthy medium for the magical "white stone" to be given to someone with a pure heart to transform into Darna, the savior and the symbol of the Adranika race. Aio boards a space ship to Earth, and moments later, the planet Marte is destroyed.

With Braguda's ship right behind her, Aio is forced to make a crash landing on Earth. Little did she know that Braguda also landed on Earth, ready to take possession of the mystic stone.

The Race of Adranika together with Anomalka was destroyed including Queen Adran. Aio and Queen Braguda managed to escape. Aio went to Earth to give the white stone to the chosen one, Narda. While Braguda manages to get the white stone and combine its power to her black stone to convert all humans to Anomalkans and terraform the planet into a New Planet Marte.

It was later revealed that there were some Adranikan survivors who managed to escape the destruction of the Planet Marte and had colonized a new one in a distant solar system.

Without Queen Adran to guide them, the remaining misguided survivors of the Adranika race had their own intentions to reshape the Planet Earth into its "perfect image." But Darna eventually prevailed even against her own benefactors and the Earth was left to chart its own future.

See also
 Darna
 Darna (2005 TV Series)
 Queen Adran

External links

THE OFFICIAL DARNA WEBSITE
Other article of Adranika 
Darna TV series Site

References

Fictional species and races
Darna